Pedro de Valdivia is an underground metro station on the Line 1 of the Santiago Metro, in Santiago, Chile. The station is named for the nearby Pedro de Valdivia Avenue, which in turn was named for Pedro de Valdivia. It was opened on 22 August 1980 as part of the extension of the line from Salvador to Escuela Militar.

The platform level features a vaulted drop ceiling of stained glass. A second work of art is entitled La Ciudad (The City), which consists of four enameled steel murals placed on the walls of the four platform stairways. Both artworks were unveiled on January 13, 1999.

It is expected that by 2027 this station will be combined with the future Line 7.

Gallery

References

Santiago Metro stations
Railway stations opened in 1980
1980 establishments in Chile